Vernon Johnson (born April 17, 1992) is a former American football wide receiver. He played college football at Midwestern State University, Southwestern College, and Texas A&M University–Commerce.

High school career 
Johnson attended Brewer High School in Fort Worth. During his senior season in 2009, he had 76 receptions for 1,006 yards and 11 touchdowns.  He also lettered in basketball as well as track & field.

College career
Johnson began his college career at Midwestern State University; he redshirted in 2010 and caught 6 passes for 146 yards and a touchdown as a reserve receiver in 2011. 

In 2012, he transferred to Southwestern College, where he caught 49 passes for 1,082 yards and 15 touchdowns. 

During his first season at Texas A&M University–Commerce in 2013, he set school records in receptions (70), receiving yards (1,350), and receiving touchdowns (13), although his touchdown reception record was broken by his teammate Ricky Collins during the next season. He also added 496 kick return yards and led the conference in all purpose yards per game with an average of 183.8. In addition, he won the Lone Star Conference (LSC) wide receiver of the year award.
In 2014, Johnson totaled 77 receptions for 1,258 yards and 12 touchdowns, thus breaking his reception record from the previous season; he also tallied 304 kick return yards. He helped lead a conference championship-winning A&M–Commerce team that led the nation in both average points per game (54.1) and average yards per game (535.4). The team also opened the season with a record-breaking performance against East Texas Baptist in which it scored 98 points, amassing 986 total yards of offense and 13 touchdowns. This performance helped Johnson earn his second LSC wide receiver of the year honor, while also being named an AFCA first team All-American.

After his college career Johnson was selected to compete in the NFLPA Collegiate Bowl. Draft analysts projected him to be drafted in the 5th or 6th round of the NFL Draft, and he drew comparisons to Bruce Ellington. NFL draft analyst Lance Zierlein described Johnson as a "creative, instinctive receiver who has the feet and hips to make defenders miss and the acceleration to hit the big play either after the catch or down the field."

NCAA stats

Professional career

Detroit Lions
After going undrafted in the 2015 NFL Draft, Johnson signed with the Detroit Lions as a free agent. He was cut from the team on August 31, 2015.

Wiesbaden Phantoms 
Johnson played with the Wiesbaden Phantoms of the German Football League during 2016 season.

Ottawa Redblacks 
Johnson signed with the Ottawa Redblacks on June 7th, 2017. He was cut from the team on June 18th, 2017.

BC Lions 
Johnson signed with the BC Lions on May 9th, 2018.

References

1992 births
Living people
Players of American football from Fort Worth, Texas
Players of American football from San Diego
American football wide receivers
Texas A&M–Commerce Lions football players
Detroit Lions players

External links